The Strabane Ambush was a British Special Air Service ambush against a three man Provisional Irish Republican Army (IRA) unit. All three members of the IRA unit were killed in the ambush. At the time it was the most successful SAS operation against the IRA, until the Loughgall ambush two years later in 1987 in which eight IRA volunteers were killed.

Background
Strabane was one of the IRA's most deadly strongholds during The Troubles. IRA and Irish National Liberation Army Volunteers in Strabane carried out attack after attack against the British security forces; between 1971 and 1991 no fewer than 16 attacks were launched by Irish Republicans against British troops and RUC police which resulted in the death of at least one member of the British security forces in each of those attacks, the British Army and RUC bases in Strabane were constantly attacked with sniper fire, bombings, grenades, mortar attacks and RPG attacks. Strabane was once the most bombed town in Europe in proportion to its size, and was the most bombed town in Northern Ireland.

A few weeks earlier in December 1984, the Special Air Service (SAS) carried out two ambushes against the Provisional IRA Derry Brigade which killed four IRA volunteers, in the first in the Kesh ambush Kieran Fleming and another IRA volunteer was killed, four days later Kieran's cousin William Fleming and Danny Doherty were killed in another ambush.

Ambush 

On the 23 February 1985, an IRA active service unit while returning weapons or bringing new weapons to an arms cache in Plumbridge Road in Strabane were suddenly ambushed by British Army SAS unit and all three IRA volunteers were killed on the spot.  Local witness said they heard that no warning to surrender was given by the SAS as the men entered a field which is when the SAS unit fired over 100 rounds at the Volunteers killing them instantly. The IRA volunteers killed at Strabane were unit Commander Charles Breslin (21) and Michael Devine (22) and his brother David Devine (16). David Devine was the youngest IRA volunteer killed in the conflict.

Aftermath
This ambush was the first in a number of high-profile SAS and undercover soldier ambushes and operations between 1985 – 1992 especially targeting the IRA's units around the Fermanagh, Tyrone & Armagh borders. A year later the IRA's Fermanagh commander Séamus McElwaine was killed during an ambush, and in 1987 eight IRA volunteers from the Provisional IRA East Tyrone Brigade were killed in the Loughgall ambush, in 1988 three IRA Volunteers were  killed during Operation Flavius in Gibraltar, in August of the same year three more IRA men were killed in the Ambush at Drumnakilly, in 1991 three more volunteers were killed in the Coagh ambush and finally in February 1992 the Clonoe ambush four IRA volunteers were killed.

See also
Ambush at Drumnakilly
Loughgall ambush
Coagh ambush
Clonoe ambush
The Troubles in Strabane

References

Further reading
Moloney, Ed: A secret history of the IRA. Penguin Books (2002).
Urban, Mark: Big Boys’ Rules: The SAS and the Secret Struggle Against the IRA. Faber and Faber (1992).

The Troubles in County Tyrone
Provisional Irish Republican Army actions
Deaths by firearm in Northern Ireland
People killed by security forces during The Troubles (Northern Ireland)
Operations involving British special forces
Special Air Service
1985 in Northern Ireland
Conflicts in 1985
Military history of County Tyrone
British Army in Operation Banner
Military actions and engagements during the Troubles (Northern Ireland)
20th century in County Tyrone
Ambushes
February 1985 events in the United Kingdom
Ambushes in Northern Ireland